Llust'a (Aymara for slippery, also spelled Llustha) is a mountain in the Bolivian Andes, about  high. It is situated in the La Paz Department, Murillo Province, La Paz Municipality, east of the main range of the Cordillera Real. Llust'a lies northeast of the mountains Kunturiri and Turini. A little river named Ch'iyar Jawira ("black river", Chias Jahuira) originates near the mountain. It flows to the northeast.

References 

Mountains of La Paz Department (Bolivia)